The 2016–17 TNT KaTropa season was the 27th season of the franchise in the Philippine Basketball Association (PBA).

Key dates
October 22, 2016: TNT KaTropa appointed Nash Racela to be its head coach replacing Jong Uichico.
October 30: The 2016 PBA draft took place at Midtown Atrium, Robinson Place Manila.

Draft picks

Special draft

Regular draft

Roster

Philippine Cup

Eliminations

Standings

Game log

|- style="background:#fcc;"
| 1
| November 23
| Rain or Shine
| L 87–101
| Ranidel de Ocampo (24)
| Ranidel de Ocampo (10)
| Ranidel de Ocampo (5)
| Smart Araneta Coliseum
| 0–1
|- style="background:#cfc;"
| 2
| November 27
| Barangay Ginebra
| W 108–103
| Ranidel de Ocampo (22)
| de Ocampo, Rosario (7)
| Matt Ganuelas-Rosser (5)
| Smart Araneta Coliseum
| 1–1

|- style="background:#cfc;"
| 3
| December 2
| Blackwater
| W 99–92
| Castro, Tautuaa (20)
| Ranidel de Ocampo (8)
| Jayson Castro (5)
| Smart Araneta Coliseum
| 2–1
|- style="background:#fcc;"
| 4
| December 9
| Meralco
| L 87–98
| Jayson Castro (23)
| Kelly Williams (8)
| Jayson Castro (7)
| Smart Araneta Coliseum
| 2–2
|- style="background:#cfc;"
| 5
| December 16
| Phoenix
| W 117–98
| Castro, Williams (18)
| Kelly Williams (10)
| Ryan Reyes (6)
| Smart Araneta Coliseum
| 3–2
|- style="background:#cfc;"
| 6
| December 23
| Alaska
| W 109–100
| Troy Rosario (26)
| Carey, de Ocampo, Williams (8)
| Jayson Castro (6)
| PhilSports Arena
| 4–2

|- style="background:#fcc;"
| 7
| January 7
| NLEX
| L 98–110
| Jayson Castro (17)
| Carey, Williams (10)
| Jayson Castro (7)
| Angeles University Foundation Sports Arena
| 4–3
|- style="background:#fcc;"
| 8
| January 15
| Star
| L 77–88
| Ranidel de Ocampo (21)
| Roger Pogoy (11)
| Jayson Castro (4)
| Smart Araneta Coliseum
| 4–4
|- style="background:#cfc;"
| 9
| January 18
| Mahindra
| W 104–92
| Troy Rosario (18)
| Reyes, Rosario (9)
| Castro, Pogoy, Reyes (4)
| Cuneta Astrodome
| 5–4
|- style="background:#cfc;"
| 10
| January 25
| GlobalPort
| W 102–98
| Roger Pogoy (20)
| Rosario, Tautuaa (8)
| Matt Ganuelas-Rosser (6)
| Cuneta Astrodome
| 6–4
|- style="background:#fcc;"
| 11
| January 28
| San Miguel
| L 94–98
| Moala Tautuaa (20)
| Troy Rosario (9)
| Jayson Castro (7)
| Ynares Center
| 6–5

Playoffs

Bracket

Game log

|- style="background:#cfc;"
| 1
| February 4
| GlobalPort
| W 109–101
| Jayson Castro (20)
| Moala Tautuaa (9)
| Matt Ganuelas-Rosser (4)
| Smart Araneta Coliseum
| 1–0
|- style="background:#cfc;"
| 2
| February 6
| GlobalPort
| W 95–90
| Ranidel de Ocampo (25)
| Troy Rosario (11)
| Jayson Castro (8)
| Smart Araneta Coliseum
| 2–0

|- style="background:#fcc;"
| 1
| February 8
| San Miguel
| L 98–111
| Jayson Castro (27)
| Moala Tautuaa (7)
| Jayson Castro (8)
| Smart Araneta Coliseum
| 0–1
|- style="background:#cfc;"
| 2
| February 10
| San Miguel
| W 87–85
| Troy Rosario (14)
| Ranidel de Ocampo (13)
| Jayson Castro (11)
| Mall of Asia Arena
| 1–1
|- style="background:#cfc;"
| 3
| February 12
| San Miguel
| W 98–92
| Ranidel de Ocampo (24)
| Ranidel de Ocampo (9)
| Jayson Castro (12)
| Smart Araneta Coliseum
| 2–1
|- style="background:#fcc;"
| 4
| February 14
| San Miguel
| L 86–97
| Larry Fonacier (15)
| Ganuelas-Rosser, Williams (7)
| Castro, Reyes (5)
| Mall of Asia Arena
| 2–2
|- style="background:#cfc;"
| 5
| February 16
| San Miguel
| W 101–94
| Castro, de Ocampo, Williams (18)
| Pogoy, Rosario, Williams (7)
| Jayson Castro (7)
| Smart Araneta Coliseum
| 3–2
|- style="background:#fcc;"
| 6
| February 18
| San Miguel
| L 88–104
| Jayson Castro (19)
| Ryan Reyes (9)
| Jayson Castro (5)
| Mall of Asia Arena
| 3–3
|- style="background:#fcc;"
| 7
| February 20
| San Miguel
| L 83–96
| Larry Fonacier (14)
| Kelly Williams (14)
| Fonacier, Pogoy (4)
| Mall of Asia Arena
| 3–4

Commissioner's Cup

Eliminations

Standings

Game log

|- style="background:#fcc;"
| 1
| March 24
| Meralco
| L 89–94
| Lou Amundson (19)
| Lou Amundson (18)
| Matt Ganuelas-Rosser (4)
| Smart Araneta Coliseum
| 0–1
|- style="background:#cfc;"
| 2
| March 26
| Phoenix
| W 134–109
| Lou Amundson (20)
| Lou Amundson (8)
| Jayson Castro (14)
| Ynares Center
| 1–1
|- style="background:#cfc;"
| 3
| March 31
| Blackwater
| W 92–89
| Roger Pogoy (24)
| Donté Greene (13)
| Castro, Pogoy, Reyes (3)
| Smart Araneta Coliseum
| 2–1

|- style="background:#cfc;"
| 4
| April 7
| NLEX
| W 126–121 (OT)
| Jayson Castro (32)
| Donté Greene (16)
| Jayson Castro (11)
| Mall of Asia Arena
| 3–1
|- style="background:#cfc;"
| 5
| April 9
| Mahindra
| W 86–84
| Donté Greene (24)
| Donté Greene (14)
| Jayson Castro (7)
| Mall of Asia Arena
| 4–1
|- style="background:#cfc;"
| 6
| April 21
| GlobalPort
| W 109–88
| Donté Greene (33)
| Greene, Williams (10)
| Ryan Reyes (6)
| Smart Araneta Coliseum
| 5–1
|- style="background:#fcc;"
| 7
| April 23
| Barangay Ginebra
| L 89–107
| Donté Greene (28)
| Donté Greene (15)
| Jayson Castro (5)
| Smart Araneta Coliseum
| 5–2
|- align="center"
|colspan="9" bgcolor="#bbcaff"|All-Star Break

|- style="background:#cfc;"
| 8
| May 5
| San Miguel
| W 112–103
| Donté Greene (41)
| Donté Greene (21)
| Greene, Rosales (4)
| Smart Araneta Coliseum
| 6–2
|- style="background:#fcc;"
| 9
| May 10
| Star
| L 97–107
| Donté Greene (29)
| Donté Greene (12)
| Kris Rosales (4)
| Mall of Asia Arena
| 6–3
|- style="background:#cfc;"
| 10
| May 20
| Alaska
| W 119–110
| Joshua Smith (23)
| Joshua Smith (10)
| Jayson Castro (7)
| Ibalong Centrum for Recreation
| 7–3
|- style="background:#cfc;"
| 11
| May 28
| Rain or Shine
| W 105–102
| Joshua Smith (23)
| Joshua Smith (12)
| Castro, Rosario (4)
| Ynares Center
| 8–3

Playoffs

Bracket

Game log

|- style="background:#cfc;" 
| 1
| June 5 
| Meralco
| W 102–84
| Jayson Castro (25)
| Tautuaa, Williams (8)
| Jayson Castro (7)
| Smart Araneta Coliseum 
| 1–0
|- style="background:#fcc;" 
| 2
| June 7 
| Meralco
| L 100–103 (OT)
| Joshua Smith (18)
| Joshua Smith (18)
| RR Garcia (5)
| Smart Araneta Coliseum 
| 1–1
|- style="background:#cfc;" 
| 3
| June 9 
| Meralco
| W 104–96 (OT)
| Castro, Smith (31)
| Joshua Smith (27)
| Joshua Smith (4)
| Smart Araneta Coliseum 
| 2–1

|- style="background:#cfc;" 
| 1
| June 11 
| Barangay Ginebra
| W 100–94
| Joshua Smith (35)
| Joshua Smith (13)
| Jayson Castro (6)
| Mall of Asia Arena 
| 1–0
|- style="background:#cfc;" 
| 2
| June 13 
| Barangay Ginebra
| W 107–103
| Joshua Smith (16)
| Joshua Smith (16)
| Jayson Castro (8)
| Mall of Asia Arena 
| 2–0
|- style="background:#fcc;" 
| 3
| June 15 
| Barangay Ginebra
| L 101–125
| RR Garcia (16)
| Joshua Smith (7)
| Castro, Garcia (3)
| Smart Araneta Coliseum 
| 2–1
|- style="background:#cfc;" 
| 4
| June 15 
| Barangay Ginebra
| W 122–109
| Jayson Castro (38)
| Kelly Williams (12)
| Jayson Castro (11)
| Cuneta Astrodome 
| 3–1

|- style="background:#cfc;" 
| 1
| June 21 
| San Miguel
| W 104–102
| Roger Pogoy (27)
| Castro, Smith (9)
| Jayson Castro (10)
| Smart Araneta Coliseum 
| 1–0
|- style="background:#fcc;" 
| 2
| June 23 
| San Miguel
| L 88–102
| Jayson Castro (14)
| Tautuaa, Williams (7)
| Joshua Smith (5)
| Smart Araneta Coliseum 
| 1–1
|- style="background:#fcc;" 
| 3
| June 25
| San Miguel
| L 97–109
| RR Garcia (19)
| Joshua Smith (14)
| RR Garcia (4)
| Smart Araneta Coliseum 
| 1–2
|- style="background:#cfc;" 
| 4
| June 28
| San Miguel
| W 102–97
| Joshua Smith (20)
| Joshua Smith (15)
| Ryan Reyes (4)
| Smart Araneta Coliseum 
| 2–2
|- style="background:#fcc;" 
| 5
| June 30
| San Miguel
| L 102–111
| Ranidel de Ocampo (19)
| Rosario, Smith (7)
| Jayson Castro (12)
| Smart Araneta Coliseum 
| 2–3
|- style="background:#fcc;" 
| 6
| July 2
| San Miguel
| L 91–115
| Troy Rosario (21)
| Kelly Williams (8)
| five players (2)
| Smart Araneta Coliseum 
| 2–4

Governors' Cup

Eliminations

Standings

Game log

|- style="background:#cfc;" 
| 1
| July 28
| Kia
| W 106–96
| Michael Craig (21)
| Michael Craig (13)
| Michael Craig (12)
| Ynares Center 
| 1–0

|- style="background:#fcc;" 
| 2
| August 2
| San Miguel
| L 91–97
| Michael Craig (16)
| Michael Craig (18)
| Ranidel de Ocampo (5)
| Smart Araneta Coliseum 
| 1–1
|- style="background:#cfc;" 
| 3
| August 4
| Alaska
| W 107–106
| Michael Craig (28)
| Michael Craig (19)
| Jayson Castro (10)
| Smart Araneta Coliseum 
| 2–1
|- style="background:#fcc;" 
| 4
| August 20
| Rain or Shine
| L 73–105
| Glen Rice Jr. (19)
| Ranidel de Ocampo (11)
| Ryan Reyes (4)
| Smart Araneta Coliseum 
| 2–2
|- style="background:#cfc;"
| 5
| August 25
| Phoenix
| W 110–103
| Glen Rice Jr. (38)
| Glen Rice Jr. (9)
| Glen Rice Jr. (5)
| Smart Araneta Coliseum
| 3–2
|- style="background:#cfc;"
| 6
| August 30
| Blackwater
| W 117–96
| Glen Rice Jr. (31)
| Troy Rosario (9)
| Castro, Rice Jr. (4)
| Mall of Asia Arena
| 4–2

|- style="background:#fcc;" 
| 7
| September 1
| GlobalPort
| L 112–119
| Glen Rice Jr. (39)
| Glen Rice Jr. (13)
| Glen Rice Jr. (5)
| Ynares Center 
| 4–3
|- style="background:#cfc;"
| 8
| September 6
| Meralco
| W 113–107
| Glen Rice Jr. (32)
| Kelly Williams (13)
| Ryan Reyes (4)
| Smart Araneta Coliseum
| 5–3
|- style="background:#cfc;" 
| 9
| September 13
| NLEX
| W 112–107
| Glen Rice Jr. (25)
| Glen Rice Jr. (15)
| Glen Rice Jr. (10)
| Ynares Center 
| 6–3
|- style="background:#cfc;" 
| 10
| September 17
| Star
| W 104–99
| Glen Rice Jr. (43)
| Glen Rice Jr. (19)
| Glen Rice Jr. (9)
| Ynares Center 
| 7–3
|- style="background:#cfc;" 
| 11
| September 23
| Barangay Ginebra
| W 121–92
| Glen Rice Jr. (36)
| Kelly Williams (11)
| Jayson Castro (7)
| Smart Araneta Coliseum 
| 8–3

Playoffs

Bracket

Game log

|- style="background:#fcc;"
| 1
| September 27
| Rain or Shine
| L 102–106
| Kelly Williams (23)
| Troy Rosario (16)
| Castro, Rice Jr. (6)
| Mall of Asia Arena
| 0–1
|- style="background:#cfc;"
| 2
| September 29
| Rain or Shine
| W 118–114
| Glen Rice Jr. (34)
| Glen Rice Jr. (16)
| Jayson Castro (12)
| Smart Araneta Coliseum
| 1–1

|- style="background:#fcc;"
| 1
| October 2
| Barangay Ginebra
| L 94–121
| Glen Rice Jr. (26)
| Glen Rice Jr. (10)
| Jayson Castro (7)
| Smart Araneta Coliseum
| 0–1
|- style="background:#cfc;"
| 2
| October 4
| Barangay Ginebra
| W 103–96
| Glen Rice Jr. (21)
| Kelly Williams (11)
| Jayson Castro (10)
| Batangas City Coliseum
| 1–1
|- style="background:#fcc;"
| 3
| October 6
| Barangay Ginebra
| L 103–106
| Glen Rice Jr. (44)
| Glen Rice Jr. (20)
| Jayson Castro (9)
| Smart Araneta Coliseum
| 1–2
|- style="background:#fcc;"
| 4
| October 8
| Barangay Ginebra
| L 105–115
| Troy Rosario (28)
| Troy Rosario (10)
| Jayson Castro (9)
| Smart Araneta Coliseum
| 1–3

Transactions

Trades

Pre-season

Commissioner's Cup

Recruited imports

Awards

References

TNT Tropang Giga seasons
TNT KaTropa season